Ngāti Raukawa is a Māori iwi with traditional bases in the Waikato, Taupo and Manawatu/Horowhenua regions of New Zealand. In 2006, 29,418 Māori registered their affiliation with Ngāti Raukawa.

History

Early history 

Ngāti Raukawa recognise Raukawa, son of Tūrongo and Māhina-o-rangi, as their eponymous ancestor, who was descended from the settlers of the Tainui canoe. One of his descendants was Maniapoto, ancestor of the Ngāti Maniapoto iwi. Ngati Raukawa established their ancestral homeland in the Waikato region.

In the mid-17th century, the Ngāti Raukawa rangatira Whāita, Tama-te-hura, and Wairangi conquered the section of the upper Waikato river between Putāruru and Ātiamuri in the Ngāti Raukawa–Ngāti Kahu-pungapunga War. After this war, Wairangi settled the area south of Whakamaru and his descendants, the Ngāti Wairangi, now share Mōkai marae with a number of other hapu. Whāita took the section furthest up the river, around Pōhatu-roa and his descendants, the Ngāti Whāita, have their marae at Ōngāroto, on the north bank of the Waikato River, a little west of Ātiamuri.

In the early 19th century, significant numbers of Ngāti Raukawa  were forced south during the Musket Wars. Led by Te Whatanui and other chiefs, they joined Ngāti Toarangatira in a southwards migration through the North Island, which proceeded in three stages. Land was taken from Rangitikei to Kapiti, where a large number of pā were built and subtribes established. This brought the new settlers into conflicts with established tangata whenua in the southern parts of the North Island.

Four of the subtribes, Ngāti Waewae, Ngāti Pikiahu, Ngāti Matakore and Ngāti Rangatahi, are based on the Te Reureu block, between the Waitapu and Rangitawa Streams, at Kakariki, beside the Rangitīkei River.

Modern history 

Ngāti Raukawa has undergone great change in the 20th century. After World War II, many Ngāti Raukawa left their traditional lands and migrated to cities. Starting in 1975, a determined effort was made to revitalise traditional language and establishments.

Ngāti Raukawa have established a large number of marae and other institutions, including Raukawa Marae and Te Wānanga o Raukawa, a centre for higher learning. Administrative organisations include the Raukawa Trust Board and Te Rūnanga o Raukawa.

Media

Raukawa FM

Raukawa FM is the official station of Ngāti Raukawa. It was set up by Te Reo Irirangi o Ngati Raukawa Trust on 23 October 1990. Many of its first hosts were Tokoroa High School students, and most of its staff are still volunteers.

The station was co-founded by Emare Rose Nikora and Whiti te-Ra Kaihau. Nikora was a leader of the Māori language revival movement, and was the station's first Māori language newsreader, manager and board member. She was recognised for her work with a Queen's Service Medal for services to Māori.

Te Upoko O Te Ika

Wellington pan-tribal Māori radio station Te Upoko O Te Ika has been affiliated to Ngāti Raukawa since 2014.

It began part-time broadcasting in 1983 and full-time broadcasting in 1987, making it the longest-running Māori radio station in New Zealand.

Notable people

 Hori Ahipene, actor and director
 Tungia Baker, actress
 Georgina Beyer, world's first transgender mayor and parliamentarian
 Nancy Brunning, actress and director
 Jolene Douglas, artist
 Eddie Durie, judge
 Mason Durie, psychiatrist
 Mihi Edwards, memoirist, social worker, teacher and kaumātua
 Billy Guyton, rugby union player
 Patricia Grace, author
 Karl Leonard, carver and weaver
 Jaimee Lovett, canoeist
 Haane Manahi, soldier
 Ike Robin, sportsman, businessman and orator
 Te Rangiataahua Kiniwe Royal, tribal leader, soldier and sportsman
 Jacinta Ruru, academic
 Harata Solomon,  teacher and religious leader
 Bruce Stewart, playwright
 Kingi Te Ahoaho Tahiwi, teacher and interpreter
 Pirimi Pererika Tahiwi, teacher and community leader
 Codie Taylor, rugby union player
 Te Ahukaramū Charles Royal, academic
 Hana Te Hemara, Māori activist
 Te Whatanui, tribal chief
 Hēnare Mātene Te Whiwhi, tribal leader and chief
 Inia Te Wiata, singer, actor and carver
 Rima Te Wiata, singer, comedian and actress
 Mahinārangi Tocker, singer-songwriter
 Rota Waitoa, Anglican clergyman

See also 
 Ngāti Huia, a subtribe
 List of Māori iwi

References

Bibliography

External links
 Raukawa Settlement Trust, South Waikato
 Te Wānanga o Raukawa